Toby Booth (born 6 February 1970) is an English rugby union coach, currently head coach at Ospreys in the Pro14. He was educated at The Harvey Grammar School, Folkestone, a prominent football-playing school.

He became a qualified electrician, before attending St. Mary's University College, Strawberry Hill (1994–97), where he studied Sports Science. He later worked as a lecturer there whilst completing his MSc.

Coaching career
Booth joined London Irish in 2002 as assistant academy manager where he helped recruit the first players for the academy – many of whom are now playing for the Exiles' and Bath's first teams. After coming through the ranks at the academy he was appointed head coach at London Irish in 2008 after the previous coach, Brian Smith, became an  coach. Booth's team reached the final of the Guinness Premiership in his first season in charge after finishing third in the league. They went on to finish sixth (twice) and seventh.

In May 2012 Booth left London Irish for Bath to work under new head coach Gary Gold as forwards' coach, two months after Smith's return to the Exiles as director of rugby. In November 2019 he joined Harlequins as assistant coach. It was announced in February 2020 that Booth would be joining Ospreys as head coach at the end of the 2019/2020 season.

Personal life
Whilst being interviewed on Sky Sports News, Booth mentioned he is a Manchester City supporter.

References

External links
 London Irish profile

English rugby union coaches
Living people
People educated at The Harvey Grammar School
1970 births
Ospreys (rugby union) coaches